
Gmina Rzepin is an urban-rural gmina (administrative district) in Słubice County, Lubusz Voivodeship, in western Poland.

Villages
Apart from the town of Rzepin, Gmina Rzepin contains the villages and settlements of Drzeńsko, Gajec, Jerzmanice, Kowalów, Lubiechnia Mała, Lubiechnia Wielka, Maniszewo, Nowy Młyn, Radów, Rzepinek, Serbów, Starków, Starościn, Sułów and Zielony Bór.

Neighbouring gminas
Gmina Rzepin is bordered by the gminas of Cybinka, Górzyca, Ośno Lubuskie, Słubice and Torzym.

Twin towns – sister cities

Gmina Rzepin is twinned with:
 Hoppegarten, Germany

References

Rzepin
Słubice County